Pindrawal is a town in Bulandshahr district of Uttar Pradesh, India

History 

Pindrawal was a zamindari during British India belonging to dynasty of Lalkhani Badgujar Muslim Rajput community.

Raja’s of Pindrawal 

 Raja Mir Syed Muhammad Baquar Ali, Khan Bahadur, C.I.E.
 Raja Mir Syed Jafar Ali Khan Bahadur
 Raja Mir Syed Akbar Ali  Khan Bahadur O.B.E.

Raja Mir Syed Muhammad Baquar Ali Khan was the board of trustees and also the founder vice president of the management committee of Muhammadan Anglo-Oriental College, Aligarh and he also donated a substantial amount of money to build Muhammadan Anglo-Oriental College, Aligarh. He also built and donated for Bulandshahr Town Hall.

Nearest railway station 
Atroli Road railway station is about 4 km away from Pindrawal.

References 

Cities and towns in Bulandshahr district
Former zamindari estates in Uttar Pradesh